Bandera News Philippines is a regional broadcast company in the Philippines. Its main headquarters is located in Macasaet Business Complex, Roxas St., Puerto Princesa. Bandera News operates a number of stations across the country under the Radyo Bandera brand, with Fairwaves Broadcasting Network serving as its licensee. It also operates its own television station in Palawan named Bandera News TV.

History
Bandera News Philippines started its FM operations in Puerto Princesa, Palawan and it is owned by former RMN Davao and Brigada Palawan radio announcer and current station manager of Bandera News FM, Elgin Robert Damasco. After several months, the company opened its relay stations in different cities and towns in Palawan.

Some local radio stations across the Philippines began to affiliate to Bandera News Philippines.

Radio stations
The following is a list of radio stations owned and affiliated by Bandera News Philippines.

Owned and operated

Radyo Bandera Sweet FM
Radyo Bandera stations in Western Visayas and Negros Oriental are operated under an airtime lease agreement by 5K Broadcasting Network, Inc. (formerly Xanthone Plus Broadcasting Services).

Other affiliated stations

TV stations

References

Radio stations in the Philippines
Philippine radio networks
News and talk radio stations in the Philippines
Radio stations in Palawan